Robert Cameron Orr, Ph.D formerly served as the United Nations Assistant Secretary-General for Policy Coordination and Strategic Planning in the Executive Office of the Secretary-General. He is currently the Dean of the University of Maryland School of Public Policy.

Career
Prior to joining the UN, Orr served as the Executive Director of the Belfer Center for Science and International Affairs at the Kennedy School of Government at Harvard University. Before that, he was Director of the Council on Foreign Relations in Washington, D.C. and is still a current member.

Orr was a co-director of a bipartisan commission on post-conflict reconstruction sponsored by the Center for Strategic and International Studies in Washington and the Association of the United States Army between 2001 and 2003.

Between 1996 and 2001, Orr held a variety of senior positions in the Government of the United States. He served as Deputy to the United States Ambassador to the United Nations and Director of the USUN Washington office. In this capacity, he played an active role in securing a delayed payment of nearly $1 billion of the US membership fees to the United Nations.  He was also Director of Global and Multilateral Affairs at the National Security Council, in charge of peacekeeping and humanitarian affairs.

Before working for the US government, Orr served at the International Peace Academy in New York and at the United States Agency for International Development (USAID) in Nairobi, Kenya.

Education and personal life
Orr holds a Ph.D. and M.P.A. in international relations from the Woodrow Wilson School at Princeton University, and a bachelor's degree from the University of California Los Angeles (UCLA). He speaks Spanish and Mandarin Chinese.

In 2000 he married Audrey Choi, then chief-of-staff to the Council of Economic Advisers and the daughter of children's author Sook Nyul Choi.

References

External links

Harvard Kennedy School staff
University of California, Los Angeles alumni
Princeton School of Public and International Affairs alumni
Living people
Year of birth missing (living people)
American officials of the United Nations